Regent's Business School London (informally Regent's Business School, RBS London or RBSL) is a private business school located in London, United Kingdom. The school is a part of Regent's University London the campus of which was originally built in 1913 in the midst of Regent's Park in central London.

Founded in 1997, it has grown rapidly from 10 students to more than 450. The student body is primarily international, with a large population of students from the Persian Gulf region, Asia, Northern and Eastern Europe.

Academics
The school offers a range of undergraduate business degrees and masters qualifications following the British curriculum. It offers undergraduate BA (Hons) degrees in International Business, International Finance and Accounting, International Marketing, and International Business with Design Management. It also offers postgraduate MA degrees in International Management, International Marketing Management and International Business Administration.  There is also a Business Foundation programme for students wishing to prepare to study at degree level.

External links 
 
 University Profile on Whatuni.com

Business schools in England
Education in the City of Westminster
Regent's University London
Educational institutions established in 1997
1997 establishments in England